Anatoxin may refer to:

 Toxoid, a bacterial toxin (usually an exotoxin) whose toxicity has been weakened or suppressed
 Anatoxin-a, a neurotoxin produced by cyanobacteria
 Anatoxin-a(S), a neurotoxin produced by cyanobacteria